USS PGM-10 was a  that was in service with the United States Navy during World War II, and transferred to the Philippine Navy shortly thereafter.

History
PGM-10 was laid down on 18 September 1943, as PC-805 by the Commercial Iron Works, in Portland, Oregon. After being launched on 27 October 1943, she was reclassified as PGM-10 in August 1944. On 29 November 1944, she was put into naval service as PGM-10.

On 5 January 1945, PGM-10 left San Pedro, California, for Pearl Harbor, Hawaii, and arrived outside Pearl Harbor 6 days later on 11 January 1945. Later, on 3 February 1945, she steamed for Eniwetok, escorting LSM's and LSI's. Along the journey, she passed within 15 miles of the Japanese-held Wotje Atoll, coming within sight of Kawajalin. She arrived at Eniwetok two days later on 14 February 1945, leaving once again two days later escorting 4 merchant ships and a navy tanker along with 2 other Patrol Craft as escorts.

PGM-10 would continue her duties in this fashion until 25 February 1945, when she began her first patrol duty. On 27 and 28 February 1945, she shelled a Japanese Radio Installation. By May 1945, she had four shot down Japanese planes to her credit.

Typhoon Louise
Like the ill-fated , her sister, PGM-10, was also present for Typhoon Louise. A deck log is as follows:

"17 OCT 1945.
ARRIVED OKINAWA. LARGE NUMBER OF OUR SHIPS ON REEF DUE TO TYPHOON. PGM 9 IS ON REEF. TIDAL WAVE WASHED AWAY ATOLL OF ENAWETOK."

Ship's fate
In October 1948, the ship was transferred to the State Department, Foreign Liquidation Commission. Little is known about the ships post-war life, only that she was transferred to the Philippine Navy after late 1948.

References

External links
Unofficial Crew Log, 5 January 1945 – 7 December 1945- NavSource-PGM-10
PGM-10 Crew Photo Gallery- NavSource-PGM-10
U-Boat.net, U.S.S. PGM-10- uboat.net- PGM-10

 

1943 ships
Ships of the United States Navy
Ships built in Portland, Oregon
World War II gunboats of the United States
PGM-9-class motor gunboats